Esmond Cecil Harmsworth, 2nd Viscount Rothermere (29 May 1898 – 12 July 1978) was a British Conservative politician and press magnate.

Early life
Harmsworth was the third son of Harold Harmsworth, 1st Viscount Rothermere, who had founded the Daily Mail in partnership with his brother Alfred Harmsworth, 1st Viscount Northcliffe. He was educated at Eton College and commissioned into the Royal Marine Artillery in World War I. His two older brothers were both killed in action. Esmond served as aide-de-camp to the prime minister at the Paris Peace Conference. In 1919, he was elected as a Unionist Member of Parliament for the Isle of Thanet, one of the youngest MPs ever. He served until 1929.

Press career
After 1922, the Daily Mail and General Trust company was created to control the newspapers that Lord Rothermere retained after Lord Northcliffe's death (The Times, for example, was sold).  As his father dabbled in association with the Nazis and a flirtation with becoming King of Hungary, it fell to Harmsworth to manage the businesses.  His father retired as chairman of Associated Newspapers in 1932 at the age of 64, and Harmsworth took over that role. He served as chairman until 1971, after which he assumed the titles of president and director of group finance, and chairman of Daily Mail & General Trust Ltd, the parent company, from 1938 until his death.

Harmsworth also had a significant impact on the development of Memorial University of Newfoundland (the family has had a long-standing interest in Newfoundland, having built a paper mill in Grand Falls before the outbreak of the First World War). The University's first residence in Paton College, known as Rothermere House, is named after the Viscount. Harmsworth was the first Chancellor of Memorial University and the benefactor who provided the funds to construct Rothermere House.

Personal life and death
Lord Rothermere succeeded his father in the viscountcy in 1940. He married three times and had four children:. His first marriage was to Margaret Hunnam Redhead, daughter of William Lancelot Redhead, on 12 January 1920 (divorced 1938). They had three children:

 Lorna Peggy Vyvyan Harmsworth (1920–2014) who married Neill Cooper-Key MP (1907–1981), and had issue two sons and two daughters; her younger and only surviving son was the first husband of Lady Mary-Gaye Curzon-Howe (mother by later marriages of actress Isabella Calthorpe and society beauty Cressida Bonas).
 Esmé Mary Gabrielle Harmsworth (1922–2011) who married Rowland Baring, 3rd Earl of Cromer, and had issue two sons and one daughter by her first marriage.
 Vere Harmsworth, 3rd Viscount Rothermere (1925–1998)

He married, secondly, Ann Geraldine Mary Charteris, widow of Shane Edward Robert O'Neill, 3rd Baron O'Neill, who was killed in action in 1944 in Italy.  She was the daughter of Captain Guy Lawrence Charteris and Frances Lucy Tennant and granddaughter of Hugo Richard Charteris, 11th Earl of Wemyss. They married on 28 June 1945 and divorced in 1952. Ann Charteris then married the writer Ian Fleming in 1952.

Lord Rothermere married, thirdly, Mary Murchison, daughter of Kenneth Murchison, on 28 March 1966, by whom he had a second son:

 Esmond Vyvyan Harmsworth (b. 1967), who moved to Cambridge, Massachusetts in 1993.

Lord Rothermere died on 12 July 1978, aged 80, and was succeeded by his eldest son, Vere Harmsworth.

References

External links 
 

1898 births
1978 deaths
Rothermere, Esmond Harmsworth, 2nd Viscount
Esmond
Conservative Party (UK) MPs for English constituencies
Canadian university and college chancellors
Royal Marines officers
People educated at Eton College
2
UK MPs 1918–1922
UK MPs 1922–1923
UK MPs 1923–1924
UK MPs 1924–1929
Rothermere, V2